Robert Paul "Eskimo" Clark (born June 2, 1947 in Stockton, Missouri, died April 15, 2015 in Las Vegas, Nevada) was an American professional poker player who lived in Las Vegas, Nevada.

Life and career

Robert Paul Clark grew up in Stockton, MO, one of seven brothers and sisters.

Before turning to poker, Eskimo Clark was a veteran of the Vietnam War, where he worked as a dental assistant.

Clark first finished in the money at the World Series of Poker (WSOP) in the 1988 limit omaha event.

He has also made money finishes in the $10,000 No Limit Hold'em main event in 1997 (19th) and 1998 (25th) where he was eliminated with pocket aces.

In 2003, Clark won the $1,500 No Limit Hold'em event of the Bellagio's Five Diamond World Poker Classic, earning a $160,095 prize by defeating a final table including Erik Seidel, Chris Karagulleyan, Dave "Devilfish" Ulliott, Johnny Chan and Huck Seed.

Clark began playing the World Poker Tour (WPT) during its second season. His second-place finish in the World Poker Challenge $5,000 No Limit Hold'em event earned him $310,403.

Clark's last cash at the World Series of Poker was in 2007.

His total career winnings exceeded $2,700,000. His 20 cashes at the WSOP account for $632,005 of those winnings.

Outside of poker, Clark's hobbies included baseball.

He died on April 15, 2015 in Las Vegas, Nevada at age 67.

World Series of Poker bracelets

Notes

External links
Poker Player profile
World Poker Tour profile

American poker players
1947 births
World Series of Poker bracelet winners
2015 deaths
People from New Orleans
People from Stockton, Missouri